Ralph Derek Simpson (born August 10, 1949) is an American former basketball player.  He played professionally in the American Basketball Association (ABA) and National Basketball Association (NBA) from 1970 to 1980.

Career
Simpson, a 6'6" guard/forward, was a star at Detroit's Pershing High School, where he teamed with Spencer Haywood to win the Michigan state championship in 1967.  He was offered a tryout for the 1968 United States Olympic team, but turned it down. After two strong years at Michigan State University, he signed a professional contract with the ABA's Denver Rockets (later the Denver Nuggets), and he would represent the franchise in five ABA All-Star games.

Simpson had his finest season in 1971–1972, in which he averaged 27.4 points, 4.7 rebounds, and 3.1 assists.  After the ABA–NBA merger in 1976, Simpson joined the Detroit Pistons, but his level of production dropped significantly, from 18 points per game in 1975–1976 to 11 points per game in 1976–1977, and after one-and-a-half seasons, he returned to the Denver Nuggets, now one of the ABA teams who had joined the NBA.  However, he averaged only 5.5 points during his second tenure with the Nuggets, and after two more seasons as a member of the Philadelphia 76ers and New Jersey Nets, he retired in 1980.

Simpson scored 11,785 combined ABA/NBA points in his ten-year career. His 9,953 points were the most for the Nuggets during the team's time in the ABA.

Personal life
Simpson currently lives in Denver, Colorado. His daughter is Grammy Award-winning soul singer India Arie.

References

External links
Career stats at basketball-reference.com
Ralph Simpson at Remember the ABA

1949 births
Living people
African-American basketball players
All-American college men's basketball players
American men's basketball players
Basketball coaches from Michigan
Basketball players from Detroit
Chicago Bulls draft picks
Denver Nuggets players
Denver Rockets players
Detroit Pistons players
Metro State Roadrunners men's basketball coaches
Michigan State Spartans men's basketball players
New Jersey Nets players
Parade High School All-Americans (boys' basketball)
Philadelphia 76ers players
Shooting guards
Small forwards
Pershing High School alumni
Southeastern High School (Michigan) alumni
21st-century African-American people
20th-century African-American sportspeople